Blood of the Beasts (Le Sang des bêtes) is a 1949 short French documentary film written and directed by Georges Franju. It is Franju's first film and is narrated by Georges Hubert and Nicole Ladmiral.

The film is a special feature on The Criterion Collection DVD for Franju's Eyes Without a Face (1960).

Synopsis 
Franju's film contrasts peaceful scenes of Parisian suburbia with scenes from a slaughterhouse. The film documents the slaughtering and butchering of horses, cattle, and sheep. The film is narrated without emotive language.

Production 
Franju states that he wasn't interested in the subject of slaughterhouses when he decided to make the film, but the location around the building was the Ourcq Canal, allowing him to make a documentary film. Franju stated by using a documentary film format, he was able to use both locations as lyrical counterpoints and "to explain it as a realist while remaining a surrealist by displacing the object in another context. In this new setting, the object rediscovers its quality as an object". The film marked the debut of documentary photographer Patrice Molinard who took stills during the shoot.

Blood of the Beasts was made as a black and white film as an aesthetic. Franju states "If it were in colour, it'd be repulsive... the sensation people get would be physical one."

Release 
Blood of the Beasts had no commercial release outside of Paris.

Awards 
 Grand Prix International du Court Sujet 1950

Notes

Bibliography

External links 

 

1949 films
1940s French-language films
French short documentary films
Films directed by Georges Franju
Documentary films about animal rights
1949 documentary films
Black-and-white documentary films
1940s short documentary films
French black-and-white films
1949 short films
Films scored by Joseph Kosma
1940s French films